Salimabad Union is a union of Nagarpur Upazila, Tangail District, Bangladesh. It is situated 6 km west of Nagarpur Upazila headquarter on the bank of Jamuna River.

Population

According to Population Census 2011 performed by Bangladesh Bureau of Statistics, The total population of Salimabad union is 21,674. There are 5042 households in total. Largest village in terms of population and area is Salimabad.

Administration

The centre of the union is Salimabad Bazar. The union parishad complex is also situated here. There are 6 villages in this union. These are-

Salimabad
Tarfram Ghunipara
Tebaria
Char Ghunipara
Paiksha
Maijhail

Education
The literacy rate of Salimabad Union is 50.4% (Male-51.6%, Female-49.4%).

There are several government financed primary schools in Salimabad. These are-

Salimabad Govt. Primary school
Salimabad Purbopara Govt. Primary school
Salimabad uttarpara government primary school
Tebaria government primary school
Ghunipara government primary school
Khasghunipara government primary school
Paiksha-Maijhail government primary school

There are few high schools. These are-
Salimabad union govt girls' high school
Salimabad-Tebaria Islamia high school
Ghunipara high school
Freedom fighter Anwar Khan high school

See also
 Nagarpur Upazila
 Tangail

References

Populated places in Dhaka Division
Populated places in Tangail District
Unions of Nagarpur Upazila